Stanthorpe–Texas–Inglewood Road is a continuous  road route in the Southern Downs and Goondiwindi regions of Queensland, Australia. It has two official names, Stanthorpe–Texas Road and Inglewood–Texas Road. The entire route is signed as State Route 89. Tourist Drives 5 (Amiens) and 8 (Glenlyon Dam) and the Shearer’s Way all start in Stanthorpe and run concurrent with this road for part of its length.

Stanthorpe–Texas Road (number 232) is a state-controlled district road rated as a local road of regional significance (LRRS) and Inglewood–Texas Road (number 231) is a state-controlled regional road.

Route description
The road commences as Stanthorpe–Texas Road (Connor Street) at an intersection with High Street in Stanthorpe. High Street is the former route of the New England Highway through Stanthorpe. The road runs generally west and south-west towards Texas, passing through several rural localities (see below). While still in Stanthorpe it passes under the current New England Highway, and Tourist Drive 5 turns north to Amiens.

The road runs through Broadwater and Greenlands, which are part of the Stanthorpe wine region, but few vineyards are visible from the road.

In Pikedale the Stanthorpe–Inglewood Road (Alternate State Route 89) exits to the north-west. From here the road tends more to the south-west and south, passing through Pikes Creek. In Glenlyon, the Glenlyon Dam Road exits to the south, and Tourist Drive 8 and the Shearer’s Way follow it. From here the road again turns west.

The road then runs through Silver Spur and enters Texas as Mingoola Road, Fleming Street and High Street. At an intersection at the western end of High Street the name changes to Inglewood–Texas Road and it exits to the north-west as Greenup Street. While still in Texas, the Texas–Yelarbon Road exits to the west. Texas Airport is adjacent to this intersection.

In Limevale the Greenup–Limevale Road exits to the north-east. 

In Brush Creek the Inglewood–Beebo Road exits to the south-west. The road enters Inglewood as Princess Street, where it ends at an intersection with the Cunningham Highway.

Tourist Drive 5
Tourist Drive 5 runs from Stanthorpe to Thulimbah on the New England Highway, travelling via Amiens, Bapaume, Passchendaele and Pozieres.

Tourist Drive 8
Tourist Drive 8, also known as the Glenlyon Dam Drive, runs from Stanthorpe to Glenlyon Dam, travelling via State Route 89 and Glenlyon Dam Road.

Shearer’s Way
The Shearer’s Way follows Tourist Drive 8 to Glenlyon Dam, and then follows Pinnacle Road and Riverton Road to Texas.

History of Stanthorpe roads

When tin was discovered in commercial quantities in 1872 there were several pastoral runs in the area surrounding what is now Stanthorpe. When, some years later, the price of tin fell, some miners turned to farming. To the west land for farming became available in several areas.

In 1877 land that had been part of many large pastoral runs in Queensland was made available for closer settlement. These included what is now Nundubbermere and what is now Pikes Creek.

As land was cleared and smaller farms were established in these areas a road was built from Stanthorpe to enable the transport of produce to market.

History of Texas roads

In 1877 land that had been part of the Texas pastoral run was opened up for selection, as was land to the east in what is now Bonshaw and Mingoola.

Land clearing and farm establishment occurred as parts of the large pastoral runs were subdivided. A road was built to support the farms. In time the development of farms and roads from Texas and Stanthorpe reached a common point, and a connecting road was the result. Although it was built much earlier, it was not until 2006 that the last section of the road was sealed.

History of Inglewood roads

From 1848 many pastoral runs were established in the areas around Inglewood. To the south, the area that is now Brush Creek was the site of a large run established in the 1850s. In 1877 part of that land was opened for selection, and soon smaller farms were established.

This development, plus a perceived need for Texas to be better connected to the nearest commercial centre, led to the building of a road from Inglewood to Texas. This road was the only means of commerce between the towns until the Texas railway line was opened in 1930.

Major intersections
All distances are from Google Maps.

See also

 List of road routes in Queensland
 List of tourist drives in Queensland
 List of numbered roads in Queensland

References 

Roads in Queensland